Jia Yueyue and Jia Panpan are twin giant pandas (Ailuropoda melanoleuca) born at the Toronto Zoo on 13 October 2015, to mother, Er Shun. They were the first giant pandas to be born in Canada, and only the second giant panda twins to survive the neonatal period in North America.  Their birth was the result of one of two artificial insemination procedures overnight from 13 to 14 May 2015. The pandas went on public exhibit at the zoo on 12 March 2016. The last day that the giant pandas were viewable at the Toronto Zoo was 18 March 2018. The two pandas have since left Canada and now reside at the Chengdu Research Base of Giant Panda Breeding.

Naming
Their names were revealed on 7 March 2016. In March 2016, the prime minister of Canada, Justin Trudeau, the premier of Ontario, Kathleen Wynne, and the mayor of Toronto, John Tory, attended their naming ceremony at the zoo.

Jia Yueyue and Jia Panpan are great-grandchildren of Pan Pan, the longest living male giant panda to have lived in captivity.

See also 
 Giant pandas around the world

References 

Individual giant pandas
2015 animal births